Pater is a 2011 French drama film directed by Alain Cavalier. It premiered In Competition on 17 May at the 2011 Cannes Film Festival.

Plot
Cavalier and Lindon play versions of themselves, starting work on a film in which they will play the president of the republic and a politician who will be prime minister, respectively.

Though improvised conversations, they sketch out both their fictional and actual relationships.

Cavalier's President character calls on Lindon's Prime Minister character to pass a law on the maximum salary at the national level. The project met with strong opposition and the two men can not muster a majority of MPs behind the project.  Having the feeling of not being sufficiently supported by the President, Lindon decides to run for president himself.

Cast
 Vincent Lindon as Vincent Lindon
 Alain Cavalier as Alain Cavalier
 Bernard Bureau as Bernard Bureau

Production
Pater was shot with a handheld digital camera

Cavalier said "The year of working together changed us [...] I wasn’t in charge the way a director is in charge. And we discovered things gradually. I used to plan the last shot from the start, and thought about that from the beginning. I had studied Greek tragedy, I was influenced by films like Renoir's Partie de campagne and John Huston's Asphalt Jungle. Now I want to forget all that."

The film was made with a skeleton script and cast. "I didn’t write one line of dialogue, just a sketch, nine pages, about how I met Vincent, and how we decided to work together, how I would film." Cavalier said the film is "about the intimacy of power and how it is like the intimacy of making a movie together, without a cast, without a classical team."

Themes
The New York Times described the film as "an improvised adventure, a game of Let’s Pretend with a political twist, with scenes of the two picnicking in the forest on a gourmet feast, plucking the proper ties and suits from vast closets, and talking of cabbages and kings, as it were — and of how they feel about women."

Reception

Critical response
On Rotten Tomatoes, the film has 3 reviews, 1 positive and 2 negative.

Variety described it as the "epitome of an in-joke, best appreciated by director Alain Cavalier and his slender cast, Pater is a confounding slog for most anyone else. Curiously tapped for a Cannes competition slot, this sloppily improvised film about filmmaking doesn't bother to make clear whether and how it's a mock-docu account of the shooting of a French prime minister biopic, as Cavalier cavalierly squanders the chance to represent his meta-narrative in stylistically coherent terms."

Peter Bradshaw of The Guardian wrote: "It is a very verbose film - yet with interesting things to say."

The A.V. Club gave it a grade of "D+", saying: "I didn’t get it, and neither did any other American I spoke to, but the French were applauding madly throughout, apparently in response to policy statements. Director and star have an easy rapport, but that’s all I got out of it, I’m afraid."

References

External links
 

2011 films
2011 drama films
French drama films
2010s French-language films
Films directed by Alain Cavalier
Films produced by Michel Seydoux
2010s French films